Point Pleasant Junior/Senior High School is located in Point Pleasant, West Virginia. It is located in Mason County and is the largest high school in the county. It is operated by Mason County Schools.

History 
On December 19, 1794 the General Assembly of Virginia enacted that “ of land, the property of Thomas Lewis (a part of the General Andrew Lewis Grant) at the mouth of the Great Kanawha River in the said County of Kanawha, as they are already laid off into lots and streets, shall be established a town by the name of Point Pleasant, and Leonard Cooper, John Van Bibber, Isaac Tyler, William Owens, William Allyn, John Reynolds, Allen Prior, George Clendenin, and William Morris, gentlemen, appointed trustees thereof.”

When the town was laid off at the junction of the Ohio and Great Kanawha Rivers, a lot was given by Thomas Lewis as a site for a school building.  On this lot, the present location of Langston school which was formerly only for African-American children, a small log building was erected as a school building and a church.  A frame building replaced this at a later date.  In 1848 funds were raised by subscription among the citizens of the town to build a better school on the same lot.

This movement resulted in a brick structure of two rooms, to which two more were later added.  In 1865 when the public school system was established in West Virginia this subscription school became one of the district schools of Mason County.  By an act of the Legislature dated February 24, 1887, the Independent School District of Point Pleasant was created out of a part of Lewis District.  To meet the needs of a growing population, two smaller school buildings were erected in the suburbs of the town. These schools were discontinued in 1890, when a progressive Board of Education, composed of Colonel H. R. Howard, Mr. G. W. Tippett and Captain W. H. Howard opened to all the white children of Point Pleasant the present Central grade school building of eight rooms, library and office, and an extra recitation room for the High School.  In 1897 the nucleus of a library was secured and since 1904, through the energy of superintendents, principals, teachers and boards of education, has been increased to 950 volumes of carefully selected material.

At an early date in history of Point Pleasant provisions were made for a high school, but the organization was not perfected until 1890.  The first class of four students was graduated in 1892.  Since that time there have been 936 boys and girls graduated from the High School.  In the fall of 1897 with R.A. Riggs, Superintendent, and Peter H. Steenbergen, Principal of the High School, the work of the schools was re-organized, and the high school made a separate department, though occupying the same building as the grades.

In 1897 a four-year course was established for the high school with an enrollment as follows: 20 seniors, 12 juniors, 17 sophomores, and 18 freshmen.  There were nine graduates in the spring of 1898.  With a superintendent and high school principal the work continued for the next three years and was established on a firm basis.  Mr. Riggs continued another year, as superintendent with L.S. Echols became superintendent with R.D. Steed as principal.  In the fall of 1903 Peter H. Steenbergen became superintendent with Bertha Steinback ( Mrs. Filson) as high school principal, and Mary McCulloch, teacher; the work of the high school was again given change for improvement.

According to a “History of the Point Pleasant Schools, 1907”, written by Bertha Steinbach and Mary McCulloch, the work of both the grade and high school was expanded about 1907.  The Board of Education consisted of Captain W.H. Howard, President; Messrs. J.W.C. Heslop and C.L. Whaley, Commissioners and Mr. E.W. Craig, Secretary.  The grade teachers were: Misses Margaret Moriarty, Eva Hughes, Lissie Hogg, Nora Sommerville, Lillian Kincade, Virginia Behan and Nannie E. Jarrot.   A card system of keeping the records at the high school was devised, music and art were added to the curriculum, the teaching force was increased, and optional courses were offered.  The standards for graduation were raised.

In 1907, after the resignation of Mr. Steenbergen, plans for a building to accommodate the increased high school attendance were carried out and the cement block building in Central Grad schoolyard were erected.  Here the high school was housed until the fall of 1918 when the present high school building was occupied.

The plans for the present high school building were prepared and the building was begun with the following in charge of the schools: Board of Education: Peter H. Steenbergen, President, J.W.C. Heslop, and George P. Gardner, Commissioners.  The building was completed with Peter H. Steenbergen, President, and C.K. Blackwood and R.E. Somerville, Commissioners.  Joseph C. Vance was superintendent and W.O. Snarr was principal of the high school.  There were approximately seventy-five students enrolled in the high school, which grew slowly but steadily.

During the period 1922-1933, under the leadership of Superintendent A.T. Stanforth and his successors, Mercer L. Williams and Peter H. Steenbergen the high school enrollment was very materially increased until practically every magisterial district in the county was represented by from two to fifty six students.  The largest enrollment was 324 in the year 1928-29.  Special attention was given to the library and the services of Miss Emma Clark were secured as full-time librarian in 1926.  While the library is not large (2,000) the material has been very carefully selected.  The Dewey Decimal library system is used.

In the spring of 1926 an excellent gymnasium was ready for use.  It was built through the cooperation of Mrs. Sarah A. McCulloch, a group of forward-looking citizens, the City Council and Board of Education.  It was paid for in the course of five years through rentals.  The work was done under the advice of the Attorney General of West Virginia.

The first cottage for the use of Domestic Science to be constructed in West Virginia was opened at Point Pleasant in 1924.  The cottage was built and equipped with the idea of placing the work in Domestic Science and Art under conditions as similar to the house surroundings as possible.  The work is organized under the provisions of the Smith-Hughes Act.

Point Pleasant High School has a highly developed co-curricular program.  The Literary Societies have the oldest history of any activity in this field.  In 1898, the Irving Literary Society was formed by Lida Chambers (Mrs. Harris).  Bertha Steinbach (Mrs. Filson), and Neida Bowyer (Mrs. C.R. McCulloch).  In 1917 the Irving Literary Society was divided into two smaller societies, the Athenian and the Olympian, as it was felt that friendly rivalry was necessary to secure the best results in literary work.  The activities of the literary societies, which have been under the supervision of Miss Mary McCulloch for a period of thirty years, have won for the school the following honors in state contest work.

1920- first place in extemporaneous speech was won by Ada Barnett (Mrs. Donald P. Stough)

1920- second place in an essay was won by Theresa Dower (Mrs. Lloyd Jones)

1920- third place in oration won by Mabel Shaw (Mrs. Bartlett)

1921- second place in extemporaneous speech was won by Ada Barnett (Mrs. Stough)

1922- first place in oration was won by Stephen K. Vaught

1922- first place in debate was won by Ada Barnett (Mrs. Stough)

1923- first place in debate was won by Stephen K. Vaught

1923- first place in oration was won by Nedra Wilhelm (Mrs. E.B. Jones)

1923- first place in extemporaneous speech was won by George A. Wilson in the district  contest.

1924- the first place in extemporaneous speech was won by George A. Wilson

1925- second place in extemporaneous speech was won by Jack C. Burdette

1926- second place in extemporaneous speech was won by Jack C. Burdette

1926- first place in the district contest was won by Nedra Wilhelm (Mrs. E.B. Jones)

The Girl Reserves form a most active organization in the high school under the leadership of Miss Phyllis Brownell.  The Hi-Y Club, which is supervised by Mr. N.N. Powell, takes an active part in school activities.  The purpose of the Bible Club, which is advised by Miss Leta Ball, is expressed in the motto, “We would know the Bible.”

The Dramatic Club presents a member of first class plays each year under the guidance of Miss Edith Jordan.  This club, with the help of the senior class and the radio fund, has presented the school with the red velvet curtain and the gray cyclorama that adorn the stage.

The purpose of the Speech Club, which was organized in 1980, is to promote the work of the school in the State Literary contests.  Under the direction of Miss Edith Jordan the club has won first place in the state contest at Morgantown, Peggy McCulloch having first in essay.  Edith Kenny and Elaine Burdette won two first places in debate in the district contest held at Huntington.

The Thespian Society, directed by Miss Jordan, is an honorary national dramatic organization.  It participates in the one-act play contest each year and has won: 1931 second place “Fixins,” in 1933 first place “Quare Medicine,” 1935 second place “Smokescreen.”  Four students, Edith Kenny, Edwin Curry, Peggy McCulloch, and Saraphamas Candas have won places on the all-state cast.

The Tu-Endie-Wei, the school paper, is well planned by Miss Margaret Somerville.  It has had All American rating in the National Scholastic Press Association Critical Survey in 1932 and Select rating in the West Virginia press contest sponsored by West Virginia University.

From 1921 to 1932 the school had a well-organized and well-directed band and orchestra conducted by Mr. E.S. Matheson.  After several years intermission we again have a band conducted by Mr. E. S. Vanover, which is beginning to make public appearances.

From 1928 to 1933 Miss Charlotte Johnson supervised music in Point Pleasant Public Schools, sponsoring two glee club meetings in the high school and presenting many enjoyable concerts and operettas.  This work was discontinued because of lack of funds.

The Music Club, directed by Mr. N.M. Powell, has had a representative in all the all-state orchestras of the SEA and for the third consecutive year has won recognition in the State Federation of Music Club Contests.

Three Point Pleasant High School students under the supervision of Miss Leta Ball, entered the National essay contest “ The American Revolution and its effect on American and World History” which was sponsored by the DARs in 1932.  Fifty thousand papers representing work of students from every other state in the Union were sent to Washington to be graded.  Floris Fierbaugh (Mrs. Pascal Worley) won third place and a prize of $75.  Elaine Burdette placed fifth and received a prize of $25.  These were the only West Virginia students who received recognition in the contest.  The names of these winners were read at the Yorktown Continental Celebration.

Other worth-while clubs in Point Pleasant High School are the Girl’s Friendship Club, Sub-Deb Club, Leathernecks, Checker Club, WAA, and Current Events Club.

Both boys and girls, under the excellent training of Miss Elizabeth Franklin and Mr. Isaac Lewis, have highly developed program of interscholastic and intramural sports.   The games develop good sportsmanship and the spirit of friendly competition, which are needed in school life as well as in later life.

Intramural athletes serve as recreational period during the noon hour and after school.  In this, boys and girls who are not able to take part in inter-scholastic events, gain valuable recreation and perhaps even become interested in trying out for the inter-scholastic teams.

Athletics, such as football, baseball, tennis, wrestling, boxing, and track have long been a part of the co-curricular activities and have been conducted by such able instructors as Leidig, Williams, Law, Van Meter, Hickman, Martin, Harrick and Lewis.

In 1926 Point Pleasant High School won first place in the Quadrangle Track and Field meet in Pomeroy, Ohio and received a handsome loving cup.  In 1927 the High School was runner-up for the state championship in basketball and that same year the team went to Chicago.  In 1932 the school had an excellent basketball team, winning the sectional tournament held here, and being runner-up at the regional tournament held in Huntington.

In 1933-34 girls’ interscholastic basketball was re-instated under the direction of Miss Elizabeth Franklin.  The girls have an annual gymnastic exhibition, which is a demonstration of the work done in the girls’ physical education classes for the entire year.

Point Pleasant High School is closely linked with the life of the city and county.  This s shown in a number of ways – perhaps most through the giving of prizes.  The Joseph Friedman Memorial prize of $50, the Kiwanis prize of $25 and the alumni prize of $25 are given outstanding students in the high school each year.

The list of principals and superintendents of Point Pleasant High School shows that a very fine group of men and women have headed the school system.  There have been many excellent Boards of Education and fine teachers who are training have shaped the lives of Mason County for generations.  Two of the people who have been outstanding in shaping the policy of the school are Miss Mary McCulloch and Mr. Peter H. Steenbergen. Miss McCulloch has been head of the English department for 30 years and Mr. Steenbergen has served the school for 25 years – 12 of which he served as President of the Board of Education, 5 years of superintendent, 6 years as principal of the high school and 2 years as a teacher.

July 1, 1933 the Independent District of Point Pleasant was abolished along with all other independent districts in the state.  The Independent District had been in existence from 1887 to July 1, 1933 – a period of 46 years.  The county became the unit of school administration.  A county Board of Education, which selects a county superintendent and teachers, is elected by the people.  The first Board under the new system was selected by the State Superintendent of Schools.  Under the wise guidance of the first county Board of Education, L.C. Somerville, President, Fred C. Lewis, Emory Fry, Dr. C.V. Petty, and J. Fremont Miller (Mr. J.H. Caudill filled the vacancy caused by the death of Mr. Lewis) Point Pleasant High School seems to be firmly launched on a great period of growth.  During the school year of 1934-35 three hundred eighty-two students were enrolled in the high school.  There were thirteen teachers in the faculty, with Mr. Peter H. Steenbergen serving as a most efficient principal.  Five buses came in from the country bringing many rural students who would not, otherwise, be able to secure a high school education.  Ten teachers have AB or BS degrees and three teachers have AM degrees.  Students secure admission to West Point and the leading universities of the country without further examination.  Point Pleasant has had membership in the North Central Association of high schools and colleges since 1926.

When the present high school building was first occupied in 1916 the total enrollment was 75 students.  The enrollment for 1934-35 was 382 students, an increase of 41%.  The enrollment for 1935-36 promises to be much larger.  The crowded conditions make it absolutely necessary to have more room if the high school continues to grow in size and efficiency.

Bibliography   
Charles Henry Ambler—A History of West Virginia

J.C. Clarborne—Point Pleasant and Mason County

Phil Conley—West Virginia Yesterday and Today

H.H. Hardesty—History of Mason County

John P. Hale—Trans-Allegheny  Pioneers

Virgil A. Lewis—History and Government of West Virginia

Peter H. Steenbergen—Point Pleasant Independent School District (1887–1933)

Bertha Steinbach and Mary McCulloch—History of Point Pleasant High School, 1907

Work of 1935 Senior Class, under the direction of Miss Leta Ball, head of the History Department.

Administration and Faculty

The principal of Point Pleasant High School is William Cottrill.  The assistant principals are Kent Price, James Higginbotham, Chris O'Dell and Rachel Law.  The guidance counselors are Charla Martin, Tiffany Hersman and Diane Foreman. The following table lists the faculty at Point Pleasant High School

Athletics 

Point Pleasant High School offers many different types of athletics such as baseball, boys and girls basketball, football, golf, boys and girls soccer, softball, boys and girls tennis, boys and girls track and field, and wrestling. Point Pleasant is the smallest Class AAA school in the state of West Virginia.  The school's athletes are formally known as the Black Knights (members of the girls' teams are called the Lady Knights), but they are better known by their nickname, the Big Blacks.

Baseball

In 1972, the Point Pleasant High School baseball team made it to the state tournament, losing in the first round to Parkersburg High by a score of 4-0.  The Big Blacks waited 35 seasons before making it back to the state tourney, finally doing so in 2007 under the guidance of head coach James Higginbotham.  They also lost in the first round that year to Grafton High School by a score of 4-3.  In the 2008 season, despite a mediocre overall record of 19-16, the Big Blacks fought their way all the way to the state championship game against Logan High School.  However, they would lose the game, 13-3.

Basketball

The boys basketball team at PPHS has a rich tradition of winning sectional titles.  They have won 17 sectional titles: 1933, 1936, 1937, 1939, 1940, 1943, 1947, 1948, 1955, 1956, 1959, 1960, 1962, 1964, 1966, 1975, and most recently in 1996.  In 1926, the team made it to the West Virginia AA State Tournament, losing in the championship game to Elkins High.  They made it again to the state tournament in the 1958/59 season behind leading scorers Dale Miller, Rusty Wamsley, and Jimmy Joe Wedge, once again losing in the championship game, this time to Nuttall High School. They also made it to the state tournament in the 1974/75 season but lost in the opening round to Barboursville High School.  However, the team has fallen on hard times recently and in the 2006/07 season, under the direction of head coach Richie Blain, they finished with a record of 3-19.  In the 2007/08 season, the team won 5 games, finishing with a record of 5-18, including a 4-10 mark in conference play.  The Big Blacks rebounded in the 2008/09 season with a 14-11 record, finishing tied for second place in the Cardinal Conference. They were defeated in the regional championship by Weir High School.

The Lady Knights basketball team has only been in existence since 1991, when Rick Handley started the program.  They had not known extended success until 2005, when head coach Casby (Mitch) Meadows led them to their first winning record since the 1995-96 season. He then led the team to a school record 16 wins in the 2006/07 season. Despite losing their first six games of the 2007/08 season, the Lady Knights rallied to win 10 of their final 15 to finish with a record of 11-12, including a mark of 6-8 in conference play.

Football

The Point Pleasant Big Blacks have a rich tradition of football that dates back to 1921. From 1921 to 2019, the Big Blacks have a record of 511-434-26 (Record not completely accurate, missing five seasons, research done by Andrew Layton) including 16 State Playoff appearances, 9 quarterfinals, 3 semifinals, 1 runner up, and 8 undefeated regular seasons. From 1975-2006, there was one man patrolling the sidelines at Sanders Memorial Stadium, Steve Safford.  Coach Safford enjoyed success as Point Pleasant's head football coach, having several great seasons. He went 9-1 in 1977, 10-0 in 1979 (1-1 Playoffs), 8-2 in 1985 (0-1 Playoffs), and 7-3 from 1996-98 going to the playoffs each of those years. He compiled a record at Point Pleasant of 164-162 (1-5 in the playoffs).  The current head coach is David Darst. Darst is 111-35 with 11 straight state playoff appearances (2008-2018) which includes 7 quarterfinals, 2 semifinals, and 1 runner up finish in 2011. Darst also has 5 undefeated regular seasons including 4 straight from 2013-2016. Point Pleasant won 43 straight regular season games from 2012 to 2016, the streak ended on a last second Hail Mary touchdown pass in the first game in 2017 against Mingo Central.

Softball

The softball team at PPHS has won two state titles. The first, in 1998, while being coached by Larry Wright. After that first title they continued to have success.  At the end of the 90's the team took on new leadership under Danny Dewhurst.  Dewhurst would end his first stint with the Lady Knights in 2004.  That year the team posted an amazing 25-5 record, falling a game short of the state tournament. In the spring of 2005 Tracie Price took over the team.  Over the next two seasons Coach Price would continue the programs winning ways.  The team again posted 20+ win seasons and in 2006 was again one game from the state tournament.  Coach Dewhurst returned in the spring of 2007 and the program didn't miss a beat again posting over 20 wins.  In 2007, the team enjoyed great success in the regular season, winning 26 games, but suffered a major disappointment when they lost in the regional semi-finals.  During the 2008 season, however, the Lady Knights would win their second state title. The team posted a 24-8 regular season record and went unbeaten in the post season to win the class AA state championship with a 3-2 victory over Scott High School finishing with a 31-8 record. The 2009 Lady Knights finished 3rd in AA with a 24-11 record marking the sixth consecutive season with 20+ wins.

Wrestling

Over the last 5 years, the wrestling team at PPHS has been the most successful team at the school.  In 2006, they placed third at the state tournament and in 2007, placed second behind Oak Glen High School, who has won the AA/A title for ten years in a row.  They went on to finish Runner Up in 2008 & 2009. The past success can be attributed to West Virginia Hall of Fame Coach Jack Cullen.

In 2010 Coach John Bonecutter took over the Wrestling Program and took them to the next level by winning the state championship, ending Oak Glen run of 13 straight AA/A State Wrestling Titles.  Point Pleasant went on to win two more state titles in 2011 & 2012 under Coach Bonecutter making it three in a row. In 2013 Point Pleasant was moved back to AAA to compete in the large schools division and finished 6th at the State Tournament, the highest AAA finish in school history. Coach Bonecutter has been named National Wrestling Coaches Association Coach of the Year in both 2010 & 2012.

State Tournament Team Finish:
1974 - 43rd * Class AAA
1975 - 21st
1976 - 7th
1977 - 17th
1978 - Did not Score
1979 - 15th
1980 - 13th
1981 - 28th
1982 - 16th
1983 - 19th
1984 - 26th
1985 - 19th
1986 - Did not Score
1987 - 27th
1988 - 32nd
1989 - 38th
1990 - 27th
1991 - 34th
1992 - 30th
1993 - 34th
1994 - 21st
1995 - 15th
1996 - 14th
1997 - 11th
1998 - 7th
1999 - 13th
2000 - 22nd
2001 - 15th
2002 - 20th
2003 - 9th * First year in AA/A
2004 - 8th
2005 - 6th
2006 - 3rd
2007 - 2nd
2008 - 2nd
2009 - 2nd
2010 - 1st
2011 - 1st
2012 - 1st
2013 - 6th * First year back in AAA
2014 - 6th

Hall of Fame

In 2007, the first class of the Point Pleasant High School Athletics Hall of Fame was inducted. The inductees were:

Pete Young-  Young was an important cog for the 1956 football team which led the state in scoring. He scored a total of 23 touchdowns and 23 two-point conversions. He was a multi-year letterman in both football and basketball.

Jerome VanMeter-  VanMeter was the second head football coach in the history of Point Pleasant and one of the greatest, if not the greatest high school coach in West Virginia history.  He was the coach at Point Pleasant from 1924–1928, and he coached football, boys basketball, and track.  He is most remembered at Point Pleasant for the 1925/26 basketball team that finished as the runner-up in the state and was nationally acclaimed.  He moved on to Beckley High School after his brief stint at Point Pleasant.  While he was at Beckley, he won 222 football games along with 3 state championships, 674 basketball games and six state championships.  He is a member of the National High School Sports Hall of Fame and the West Virginia High School Sports Hall of Fame.

Paul "Denny" Wedge Jr.-  Wedge excelled in three sports.  He was selected to the All-State baseball team as a pitcher and an outfielder his senior year.  He held the school scoring record in basketball while being selected to the All-Regional team and being an Honorable Mention to the All-State team.  He was a quarterback and made All-Conference his junior and senior years.  He was also the punter and he led the conference in punting his senior year.  He received a four-year scholarship to play football and basketball at Western Kentucky College.

Ed Sommer-  Sommer was an offensive tackle and defensive end for the Big Blacks from 1949-51.  He was selected to play in the North South All-Star game and received a four-year scholarship to West Virginia University.  He lettered as a freshman before enlisting in the army for two years.  Upon returning to WVU, he played for three years as an offensive tackle, being named a co-captain his senior season.

Bill Smith-  Smith played 3 years of basketball and was the team's leading scorer during his junior and senior years.  In those two years, he scored a total of 874 points.  His 52 points in single game in 1957 are the most ever by a Point Pleasant High School player.  For his efforts, he was selected to the All-State team his senior year.

Bob Schertzer-  Schertzer was the football coach at Point Pleasant from 1952-65.  He had a career record of 74-56-4.  In his career, he had many outstanding teams including 1956 (9-1), 1961 (9-1), and 1962 (8-0-1).

Jack Rogers-  Rogers was a coach, sportswriter, and devoted fan of Point Pleasant athletics for over 40 years.  He became the youngest editor in the state of West Virginia when he was hired by the Point Pleasant Register.  He was the baseball coach for 24 years and compiled a record of 182-121.  He published over 10,000 articles for the Register while he was a sportswriter.  He directed the Little League baseball program for 8 years and a field there is named after him.

Jimmy Lewis-  No other Point Pleasant athlete has ever equaled Lewis' accomplishments on the baseball diamond.  He had a 32-game hitting streak, which was a state record at the time that spanned almost three seasons.  In 1958, he posted a .556 batting average, with 25 hits, 19 runs scored, 4 homers, and in one inning had 6 rbis.  In 1957 he was named to the 3rd team All-State and he followed that up with 1st team honors in '58.  In addition to his accolades in baseball, he was named the football team's Most Valuable Player his senior season.

Charles "Happy" Kenny-  Kenny was Point Pleasant's version of Jim Thorpe, as he excelled in all athletic events.  He was a skilled football and baseball player, as well as a good wrestler.  In 1950, famed coach Jerome VanMeter said that Kenny, who captained VanMeter's 1924 squad was "the greatest football player I ever coached.  He could do everything anyone else could do, and do it better!".

H.R. "Dick" Herrig-  Herrig played on the most prolific football team in school history.  He scored 16 touchdowns as a junior and 17 his senior year.  He was awarded the MVP award as a senior.  He was named to the Honorable Mention All-State and All-American teams as a senior.  He played four years as a forward in basketball as well as three years as a center-fielder in baseball.  Upon graduating, he was awarded a full, four-year scholarship to West Virginia University.

Notable alumni

Virginia Mae Brown, set many "first woman" records.
Donnie Jones, head coach of the Marshall University men's basketball team.
Rebecca Durst, West Virginia University Mountaineer mascot
Bob Adkins, Green Bay Packers BB/DE/G/LB

References

External links 
 Point Pleasant Jr/Sr High School Sports
  Point Pleasant Jr/Sr High School Webpage

Public high schools in West Virginia
Schools in Mason County, West Virginia